Dutch Square is an enclosed shopping mall located in the city of Columbia, South Carolina. Currently, it features more than forty stores and restaurants, as well an AMC movie theater. Its anchor stores are Burlington Coat Factory and Office Depot.

History
Dutch Square was built by Caine Company in 1970. Initial tenants of the mall included Woolco, J. B. White, and Tapp's department stores. Other major tenants of the mall included Woolworth, Eckerd Drug, and Morrison's Cafeteria.

When it opened in 1970, the mall was advertised as the "largest mall in the Carolinas". Dutch Square's management company filed for bankruptcy in 1993 after losing several anchors, but the mall experienced a revival when it was purchased by Phillips Edison in 1995.

In 1997, Columbia annexed the mall property, thus bringing the tax revenues into the city. Shortly after this event, the facility underwent a redevelopment by the owner adding .

In late 2014, Belk announced it would shutter the Dutch Square location to focus on a new flagship location in the Columbia area.

Notes

External links
 Dutch Square website
Phillips Edison & Company Portfolio Website

Buildings and structures in Columbia, South Carolina
Tourist attractions in Columbia, South Carolina
Shopping malls in South Carolina
Shopping malls established in 1970